"Tiempe belle" is a Neapolitan song written by Vincenzo Valente in 1916; the words are by Aniello Califano.  It is Valente's most famous composition.

References 

1916 songs
Neapolitan songs